= Streamlining services =

Streamlining services (Chinese: 放管服) is a Chinese Communist Party (CCP) concept introduced by Li Keqiang in 2015.

== History ==
Streamlining administration was first proposed by the Central Committee of the Chinese Communist Party during the reform and opening up period in the 1980s. It means streamlining government agencies and delegating management authority to enterprises in order to improve their efficiency and productivity.

In 2013, Li Keqiang took office as Premier of the State Council at the first session of the 12th National People's Congress and reiterated this governing philosophy. He said streamlining administration and delegating power is part of comprehensively deepening reform and transforming government functions. The theme of the first State Council executive meeting in 2014 chaired by Li Keqiang was "streamlining administration and delegating power". Subsequently, the State Council canceled and delegated a large number of administrative approvals and other items.

Streamlining services was introduced by Li Keqiang in 2015 during a nationwide State Council teleconference on simplifying government services.

== Description ==
Streamlining services refers to three concepts:

- Streamlining administration and delegating powers (简政放权)
- Relaxing and combining management (放管结合)
- Improving services (优化服务)
